A Star Disappears (French: Une étoile disparaît) is a 1932 French comedy film directed by Robert Villers and starring Suzy Vernon, Constant Rémy and Alexandre Dréan. It was made at the Joinville Studios in Paris by the French branch of Paramount Pictures.

Cast
 Suzy Vernon as Rosine  
 Constant Rémy as Santerre  
 Alexandre Dréan as Claudius  
 Edith Méra as Liane Baxter  
 Rolla Norman as Roland Mercier  
 Marcel Vallée as Inspector Hulot 
 René Worms as Ricot  
 Sandra Ravel as Arlette  
 Marie Glory as herself 
 Meg Lemonnier as herself  
 Madeleine Guitty as herself  
 Louise Dauville as herself  
 Lucien Brulé as himself  
 Christian Argentin as himself  
 Noël-Noël as himself  
 Saint-Granier as himself  
 Henri Garat as himself  
 Fernand Gravey as himself  
 Paul Pauley as himself  
 Claude Marty as himself

References

Bibliography 
 Crisp, Colin. Genre, Myth and Convention in the French Cinema, 1929-1939. Indiana University Press, 2002.

External links 
 

1932 films
1932 comedy films
French comedy films
1930s French-language films
Films shot at Joinville Studios
Paramount Pictures films
French black-and-white films
1930s French films